is a passenger railway station located in the city of  Miura, Kanagawa Prefecture, Japan, operated by the private railway company Keikyū.

Lines
Miurakaigan Station is served by the Keikyū Kurihama Line and is located 11.2 rail kilometers from the junction at Horinouchi Station, and 63.5 km from the starting point of the Keikyū Main Line at Shinagawa Station in Tokyo.

Platforms

History
Miurakaigan Station opened on July 7, 1966, as the southern terminus of the Kurihama Line. In April 1975, the Kurihama Line was extended one station beyond Miurakaigan to the present terminus at Misakiguchi Station.

In October 2016, an experimental platform edge door system was installed for evaluation purposes on platform 1 for a period of approximately one year. The  platform edge door system developed by Mitsubishi Heavy Industries Transportation Equipment Engineering & Service is designed to handle trains with two, three or four doors per car, and the temporary installation is just one car length long.

Keikyū introduced station numbering to its stations on 21 October 2010; Miurakaigan Station was assigned station number KK71.

Passenger statistics
In fiscal 2019, the station was used by an average of 10,981 passengers daily. 

The passenger figures for previous years are as shown below.

Surrounding area
 Miura Beach
  National Route 134

See also
 List of railway stations in Japan

References

External links

 

Railway stations in Kanagawa Prefecture
Railway stations in Japan opened in 1966
Keikyū Kurihama Line
Miura, Kanagawa